Vrhovlje is a settlement in the Municipality of Sežana in the Littoral region of Slovenia right on the border with Italy.

References

External links
Vrhovlje on Geopedia

Populated places in the Municipality of Sežana